Self-Surgery is the debut studio album by American two-piece rock band Mrs. Piss, consisting of Chelsea Wolfe and Jess Gowrie. It was released through Sargent House on May 29, 2020.

Release
The album's singles, "Downer Surrounded by Uppers" and "Knelt", were released on May 14, 2020.

Critical reception

Mark Deming of Allmusic said "This is a bold, brave effort from two artists willing to push the boundaries of their music, and Mrs. Piss is a side project that has more than earned its reason to exist." Addison Herron-Wheeler of Exclaim! reviewed "Self-Surgery is heavy and punishing, darker than a lot of the music the two make on their own, and that's saying something."

Track listing
Credits are adapted from Apple Music.

References

2020 debut albums
Sargent House albums